Fishermen's Articles of Agreement Convention, 1959 is  an International Labour Organization Convention.

It was established in 1959, with the preamble stating:
Having decided upon the adoption of certain proposals with regard to fishermen's articles of agreement,...

Ratifications
As of 2022, the convention had been ratified by 23 states. Four of the ratifying states—Bosnia and Herzegovina, France, Netherlands and United Kingdom—had denounced the convention automatically.

External links 
Text.
Ratifications.

International Labour Organization conventions
Treaties concluded in 1959
Treaties entered into force in 1961
Fishers
Treaties of Belgium
Treaties of Costa Rica
Treaties of Cyprus
Treaties of Ecuador
Treaties of France
Treaties of West Germany
Treaties of Guatemala
Treaties of Guinea
Treaties of Italy
Treaties of Mauritania
Treaties of Montenegro
Treaties of Liberia
Treaties of the Netherlands
Treaties of Panama
Treaties of Peru
Treaties of Serbia and Montenegro
Treaties of Yugoslavia
Treaties of Slovenia
Treaties of Francoist Spain
Treaties of North Macedonia
Treaties of Tunisia
Treaties of the United Kingdom
Treaties of Uruguay
Admiralty law treaties
Treaties extended to Aruba
Treaties extended to French Guiana
Treaties extended to Martinique
Treaties extended to Guadeloupe
Treaties extended to Réunion
Treaties extended to Guernsey
1959 in labor relations